Cordylanthus eremicus is a species of flowering plant in the family Orobanchaceae known by the common name desert bird's beak.

It is endemic to California, where it is known from dry mountainous habitat in the San Bernardino Mountains, the mountains of the Mojave Desert region, and the Kern Plateau in the southern Sierra Nevada.

It is a reddish or yellowish green woolly annual with linear, sometimes threadlike, leaves. The inflorescence is a spike of flowers, each with a multicolored corolla and a white hairy pouch.

External links
Jepson Manual Treatment
USDA Plants Profile

eremicus
Endemic flora of California
Flora of the Sierra Nevada (United States)
Transverse Ranges
Flora of the California desert regions
Flora without expected TNC conservation status